Soldier On may refer to:

Organisation
Soldier On, an Australian charity for wounded soldiers, Spirit of the Anzacs

Music
Soldier On, album by Tim Knol 2013
Soldier On (EP), an EP by American musician Andrew Bird released in 2007

Songs
"Soldier On", a song by Oasis from the album Dig Out Your Soul released in 2008
"Soldier On", a song by the English punk rock band Dogs released in 2006 
"Soldier On" by The Temper Trap Composed by The Temper Trap covered by General Fiasco / Local Natives / The Temper Trap
"Soldier On" by Sidewalk Prophets
"Soldier On" by Tall Firs Composed by Aaron Mullan / Dave Mies
"Soldier On" by Kurt Carr / Kurt Carr Singers Composed by Kurt Carr
"Soldier On", a song from the musical A Little Princess by  Andrew Lippa and Brian Crawley
"Soldier On", a song by the Dutch rock band Di-rect released in 2020

See also  
Soldier on the hill, a novel by Australian author Jackie French published in 1997
Soldier on the Wall, an album by Alex Harvey released in 1982